Milutin "Mišo" Pajević (Cyrillic: Милутин Мишо Пajeвић; 11 November 1920 – 28 December 1992) was a Montenegrin football player and manager. Also known as Miloš Pajević, he had three caps for the Yugoslav national team and played for a number of major clubs in Yugoslavia.

International career
Pajević made his debut for Yugoslavia in an August 1949 FIFA World Cup qualification match against Israel, immediately scoring a hattrick, and has earned a total of 3 caps, scoring 3 goals. His final international was an October 1949 World Cup qualification match against France.

References

External links

 Profile at Serbian national team site
 Profile at Montenegrin Federation site
 Stats from Partizan at FK Partizan official site

1920 births
1992 deaths
Sportspeople from Cetinje
Association football forwards
Montenegrin footballers
Yugoslav footballers
Yugoslavia international footballers
SK Jedinstvo Beograd players
HAŠK players
FK Lovćen players
FK Željezničar Sarajevo players
FK Budućnost Podgorica players
FK Partizan players
Yugoslav First League players
Yugoslav Second League players
Montenegrin football managers
Yugoslav football managers
FK Željezničar Sarajevo managers